Abu al-Fadl ben Yosef Hasdai (ʾAbūu al-Faḍl Ḥaṣdāī ibn Yūṣuf ibn Ḥaṣdāī , Ḥasdai ben Yosef) was an eleventh-century philosopher, poet, mathematician, physician, and political figure in Zaragoza, then under the Taifa of Zaragoza.

He was the son of the poet Joseph ibn Ḥasdai, who had fled from Córdoba in 1013, and the grandson of Ḥasdai ibn Ishaq. In 1066 he was appointed vizier in the Hudid court of Zaragoza, a position he held until Yusuf al-Mu'taman ibn Hud ascended the throne in 1081.

References

 

11th-century Sephardi Jews
11th-century mathematicians
Converts to Islam from Judaism
Medieval Jewish philosophers
11th-century Jews from al-Andalus
Medieval Jewish poets
Medieval Jewish scientists
Mathematicians from al-Andalus
People from Zaragoza
Jewish viziers